Fritz Haller (June 13, 1905 - 1961) was an Austrian male former weightlifter, who competed in the light heavyweight class and represented Austria at international competitions. He won the gold medal at the 1937 World Weightlifting Championships and the silver medal at the 1938 World Weightlifting Championships, both in the 82.5 kg category. He also competed at the 1936 Summer Olympics and the 1948 Summer Olympics.

References

1905 births
1961 deaths
Austrian male weightlifters
World Weightlifting Championships medalists
Place of birth missing
Olympic weightlifters of Austria
Weightlifters at the 1936 Summer Olympics
Weightlifters at the 1948 Summer Olympics
20th-century Austrian people